The Amphibians of Western Australia are represented by two families of frogs. Of the 78 species found, most within the southwest, 38 are unique to the state.   15 of the 30 genera of Australian frogs occur; from arid regions and coastlines to permanent wetlands.

Frog species in Western Australia have not suffered the major declines of populations and diversity of many parts of the world.  No species is recorded as having become extinct, despite over 50% of recent worldwide extinctions being Australian.

Three species are listed as Threatened, two as Vulnerable and Geocrinia alba as Critically endangered.  Threats to the species include the fungal disease  Chytridiomycosis, though no infection has yet been recorded, and damage to habitat from altered land use and fire regimes. These processes have caused decline in many populations, however, some have successfully colonized newly created habitats such as dams or suburban gardens.  Species such as Litoria moorei (Motorbike frog) and Limnodynastes dorsalis (Pobblebonk) are very common and well known, while others are restricted to particular habitats in their distribution range.

The frogs inhabit a wide range of habitat and many in the Southwest, such as  Myobatrachidae sp., occur only in that region.  The Cyclorana (Family: Hylidae) are ground dwelling and burrowing species occurring in the North of the state. These are tree frogs, closely related in structure and reproductive biology to the other Hylidae genus - Litoria.

Fossil records of Amphibia have been identified in the north west of the state.

Naturalised species
Currently, the only non-native amphibian naturalised in Western Australia (WA) is Limnodynastes tasmaniensis (Spotted Grass Frog), which was introduced to Kununurra in the 1970s, apparently during the relocation of several hundred transportable homes from Adelaide. However, Bufo marinus (Cane Toad) occurs in the Northern Territory close to Western Australia's border, and is expected to spread into Western Australia.

Diversity

Myobatrachidae contains three sub-families (some taxonomists them as individual families), two of which occur in Western Australia. Two members of Opisthodon are included here under their synonyms in Limnodynastes.
The tree frog family, Hylidae, contains a subfamily, Pelodryadinae (Austro-Papuan tree frogs), and two genera occur.

This table is a summary of the species occurring in Western Australia, giving their common name, distribution and conservation status on the IUCN Red List.

Prehistory
Fossils of Amphibians have been found in Western Australia.

See also
List of amphibians of Western Australia
Amphibians of Australia

References